Dihydronicotinamide adenine dinucleotide-coenzyme Q reductase may refer to:

 NADH dehydrogenase
 NADH:ubiquinone reductase (non-electrogenic)